John Anderson is the debut studio album by the American country music artist of the same name. It was released in 1980 on the Warner Bros. Records label. The album produced the singles "The Girl at the End of the Bar", "Low Dog Blues", "1959", "She Just Started Liking Cheatin' Songs", "If There Were No Memories" and "Your Lying Blue Eyes".

Track listing

Personnel
 Tommy Allsup - acoustic guitar
 John Anderson - lead vocals, background vocals
 Phil Baugh - electric guitar
 Harold Bradley - six string bass guitar
 David Briggs - piano
 Tommy Cogbill - bass guitar
 Pete Drake - steel guitar
 Ray Edenton - electric guitar
 Ralph Gallant (Larrie Londin) - drums
 Tommy Jackson - fiddle
 Terry McMillan - harmonica
 Kenny Malone - drums
 Bob Moore - upright bass
 Hargus "Pig" Robbins - piano
 Billy Sanford - electric guitar
 Henry Strzelecki - bass guitar
 Pete Wade - electric guitar
 Bobby Wood - piano
 Reggie Young - electric guitar

Chart performance

References

1980 debut albums
John Anderson (musician) albums
Warner Records albums
Albums produced by Norro Wilson